Viscount Barrington, of Ardglass in the County of Down, was a title in the Peerage of Ireland. It was created in 1720 for the lawyer, theologian and politician John Barrington. He was made Baron Barrington, of Newcastle in the County of Limerick, also in the Peerage of Ireland, at the same time. 

Born John Shute, he had assumed by Act of Parliament the surname of Barrington in lieu of his patrilineal surname in 1716, having previously succeeded to the estates of Frances Barrington, married to his cousin.

Four of the younger sons of the first Viscount gained distinction. The Hon. John Barrington (c. 1722 – 1764) was a Major-General in the British Army. The Hon. Daines Barrington was a lawyer, antiquarian and naturalist. The Hon. Samuel Barrington was a Rear-Admiral in the Royal Navy. The Right Reverend the Hon. Shute Barrington was Bishop of Salisbury and Bishop of Durham.

He was succeeded by his son, the second Viscount. He was a politician and served as Chancellor of the Exchequer between 1761 and 1762. He had no surviving children and was succeeded by his nephew, the third Viscount. He was the eldest son of the Hon. John Barrington, younger son of the first Viscount. Both the third Viscount and his younger brother, the fourth Viscount, died childless. Their younger brother, the fifth viscount, had fifteen children.

On his death in 1829 the titles passed to his eldest son, the sixth Viscount. A Member of Parliament he was also Chairman of the Great Western Railway. He was succeeded by his eldest son, the seventh Viscount. He was a Conservative politician and held office as Captain of the Yeomen of the Guard between 1885 and 1886 and as Captain of the Honourable Corps of Gentlemen-at-Arms in 1886. In 1880, he was created Baron Shute, of Beckett in the County of Berkshire, in the Peerage of the United Kingdom, which entitled him to an automatic seat in the House of Lords. The title was created with special remainder to his younger brother the Honorable Percy Barrington.

Lord Barrington had two daughters but no sons and was succeeded (in the barony of Shute according to the special remainder) by his brother Percy, the eighth Viscount.  The titles descended in the direct line until the death of his grandson, the tenth Viscount, in 1960. The late Viscount was succeeded by his nephew, the eleventh Viscount.  He was the son of the Hon. Walter Barrington, second son of the ninth Viscount, who was a writer of humorous verse.  Lord Barrington was unmarried, and on his death in 1990, all the titles became extinct.

Viscount Barrington (1720)
 John Shute Barrington, 1st Viscount Barrington (1678–1734)
 William Wildman Shute Barrington, 2nd Viscount Barrington (1717–1793)
 William Wildman Barrington, 3rd Viscount Barrington (died 1801)
 Richard James Barrington, 4th Viscount Barrington (died 1814)
 George Barrington, 5th Viscount Barrington (1761–1829)
 William Keppel Barrington, 6th Viscount Barrington (1793–1867)
 George William Barrington, 7th Viscount Barrington, 1st Baron Shute (1824–1886) (created Baron Shute in 1880)
 Percy Barrington, 8th Viscount Barrington, 2nd Baron Shute (1825–1901)
 Walter Bulkeley Barrington, 9th Viscount Barrington, 3rd Baron Shute (1848–1933)
 William Reginald Shute Barrington, 10th Viscount Barrington, 4th Baron Shute (1873–1960)
 Patrick William Daines Barrington, 11th Viscount Barrington, 5th Baron Shute (1908–1990)

Male-line family tree

Notes

References

Extinct viscountcies in the Peerage of Ireland
Noble titles created in 1720